The Philadelphia Main Line, known simply as the Main Line, is an informally delineated historical and social region of suburban Philadelphia, Pennsylvania.  Lying along the former Pennsylvania Railroad's once prestigious Main Line, it runs northwest from Center City Philadelphia parallel to Lancaster Avenue, also known as U.S. Route 30.

The railroad first connected the Main Line towns in the 19th century. They became home to sprawling country estates belonging to Philadelphia's wealthiest families, and over the decades became a bastion of "old money". Today, the Main Line includes some of the wealthiest communities in the country, including Gladwyne, Villanova, Radnor, and Ardmore. Today, the railroad is Amtrak's Keystone Corridor, along which SEPTA's Paoli/Thorndale Line operates.

History

17th and 18th centuries

The Main Line region was long part of Lenapehoking, the homeland of the matrilineal Lenni Lenape Native Americans (the "true people", or "Delaware Indians"). Europeans arrived in the 1600s, after William Penn sold a tract of land, called the Welsh Tract, to a group of Welsh Quakers in London in 1681. This accounts for the many Welsh place names in the area.  However, what might be termed the "Celtification" of many Main Line place and street names occurred long after colonial times. So, for instance, as a marketing device to attract wealthy new residents, the area once awkwardly named Athensville became the more culturally glamorous Ardmore (Ardmore is a place name found in Ireland and Scotland) in 1873.

19th century
The Pennsylvania Railroad built its main line during the early 19th century as part of the Main Line of Public Works that spanned Pennsylvania. Later in the century, the railroad, which owned much of the land surrounding the tracks, encouraged the development of this picturesque environment by building way stations along the portion of its track closest to Philadelphia. The benefits of what was touted as "healthy yet cultivated country living" attracted Philadelphia's social elite, many of whom had one house in the city and another larger "country home" on the Main Line.

20th century
In the 20th century, many wealthy Philadelphia families moved to the Main Line suburbs. Part of the national trend of suburbanization, this drove rapid investment, prosperity, and growth that turned the area into greater Philadelphia's most affluent and fashionable region. Estates with sweeping lawns and towering maples, the débutante balls and the Merion Cricket Club, which drew crowds of 25,000 spectators to its matches in the early 1900s, were the setting for the 1940 Grant/Hepburn/Stewart motion picture The Philadelphia Story.

The railroad placed stops about two minutes apart, starting with Overbrook. The surrounding communities became known by the railroad station names which started at Broad Street Station in Center City Philadelphia and went on to 32nd Street Station (replaced by 30th Street Station in 1933), the 52nd Street Station (decommissioned), and then the Main Line stations: Overbrook, Merion, Narberth, Wynnewood, Ardmore, Haverford, Bryn Mawr, Rosemont, Villanova, Radnor, St. Davids, Wayne, Strafford, Devon, Berwyn, Daylesford,  Paoli, .  At least five of these station buildings, along with the first Bryn Mawr Hotel, were designed by Wilson Brothers & Company. A branch line of the Main Line (currently known as SEPTA's Cynwyd Line) extended to the communities now known as Bala and Cynwyd (via Wynnefield Station in Philadelphia), then proceeded to the West Laurel Hill Cemetery (where there was once a station, as well,) and crossed back into Philadelphia over the Schuylkill River via the famous Manayunk Bridge.  Broad Street Station was replaced with Suburban Station in 1930, and 30th Street Station replaced 32nd Street three years later. Suburban service now extends west of the Main Line to the communities of Exton, Whitford, Downingtown, and Thorndale.

The railroad line then continued on to Chicago, with major stations at Lancaster, Harrisburg and Pittsburgh.  The railroad, since taken over by Amtrak, is still in service, although its route is slightly different from the original. It also serves the Paoli/Thorndale Line of the SEPTA Regional Rail system.

Gilded Age
It was not only extremely wealthy people on the Main Line in the period 1880-1920. Wealthy households required large numbers of servants in order to maintain their lifestyle. Often these servants were Black migrants from the South and recent immigrants from Europe. For example, in the 1900 census, Tredyffrin Township was 13.5% Black; another 15% had been born in Europe. The two largest countries of origin were Italy and Ireland. The corresponding figures for Lower Merion Township were 6% Black and 15% born in Europe; almost 11% were from Ireland.

Another dimension of this story is illustrated by the community of Mount Pleasant, in Tredyffrin Township just north of Wayne. This is a community that became predominantly Black in the late 19th and early 20th centuries. 

As shown in the census for 1920, most of the Black residents of this neighborhood or their parents had come from the South. Many of the men in this neighborhood (along Henry Avenue and Mount Pleasant Avenue) were employed by the railroad, as quarry workers, or as chauffeurs and gardeners by private families. The occupations often given for women were cook and laundress. This remains a predominantly Black community to the present day.

21st century

The upper- and upper middle-class enclave has historically been one of the bastions of "old money" in the Northeast, along with places like Long Island's North Shore (AKA: "Gold Coast"); Westchester County, New York; Middlesex County, Massachusetts; and Fairfield County, Connecticut.

Neighborhoods along the Main Line include nineteenth and early twentieth-century railroad suburbs and post-war subdivisions, as well as a few surviving buildings from before the suburban development era. The area today is known primarily for several educational institutions as well as robust suburban life.

Geography

Core towns
The original Main Line towns are widely considered to follow the acronym "Old Maids Never Wed And Have Babies." From Philadelphia, they are:
Overbrook
Merion
Narberth
Wynnewood
Ardmore
Haverford
Bryn Mawr

These seven towns are characterized as one of the primary bastions of old money in Southeastern Pennsylvania.  They are comparably more dense than other suburbs and have lively, walkable downtowns. All of these communities were established along Lancaster Avenue prior to the railroad's construction.

Further, as early as 1887, Bala and Cynwyd were also included in  atlases of the Pennsylvania Railroad in Lower Merion Township and Montgomery County.   By 1908, one of the first atlases to refer specifically to the "Main Line" as a socio-cultural entity includes:
Bala
Cynwyd

Additionally, the following towns are often grouped with the core Main Line:
Wayne
Paoli
Malvern

Infill communities
Beyond the 9 aforementioned communities, many nearby communities have seeded growth in the twentieth century, either in between the core towns or nearby them. They include:
Gladwyne, immediately to the northeast of Bryn Mawr
Villanova and Radnor, between Bryn Mawr and Wayne
Strafford, Devon, and Berwyn, between Wayne and Paoli

These communities are primarily residential and consist of larger lot sizes than in the nine core towns. All of them, except Gladwyne, are on the railroad and have their own station stop.

Demographics
There is no collective data for the Main Line, so all data is by ZIP Code. In comparison, the median family income and home price for the state of Pennsylvania are $68,646 and $155,000, respectively. The following ZIP codes are those within the previously mentioned municipalities that make up the Main Line. All data, with the exception of average home price, are as of the 2000 census. For comparison, the median family income of Beverly Hills, California is $110,040.

Transportation

The Main Line is served by numerous modes of transportation among which are three commuter rail lines operated by SEPTA. Connecting the region directly with Center City Philadelphia are the Paoli/Thorndale Line which shares the former Pennsylvania Railroad four track Keystone Corridor grade with Amtrak, and the Manayunk/Norristown Line which operates over the former Reading Railroad Norristown grade. The light rail Norristown High Speed Line runs over the Philadelphia and Western Railroad line between 69th Street Transportation Center in Upper Darby and Norristown Transportation Center in Norristown. Amtrak's intercity Keystone Service (New York City to Harrisburg) and Pennsylvanian (New York City to Pittsburgh) also serve the region with stops at the jointly operated Amtrak/SEPTA stations at Ardmore and Paoli.

The main thoroughfare through the Main Line is U.S. Route 30 which follows Lancaster Avenue (formerly the Philadelphia and Lancaster Turnpike) running east to west and serves as the backbone of the region by connecting a large majority of its towns and municipalities. Other highways serving the area are the Schuylkill Expressway (I-76) which connects it to Philadelphia, and the Blue Route (I-476) which runs north to south connecting the region with the Northeast Extension and the Pennsylvania Turnpike to the north, and to Philadelphia International Airport and I-95 to the south. Along the northern edge of the Main Line, US 202 runs from the Schuylkill Expressway in a southwesterly direction, crossing US 30 in Frazer.

SEPTA also commissions suburban buses on Routes 105 and 106 to run from the 69th Street Transportation Center in Upper Darby to Rosemont (Route 105) and Paoli (Route 106). These buses run almost entirely along Lancaster Avenue.

SEPTA also offers light rail service through the Norristown High Speed Line. The Norristown High Speed Line runs along the Main Line from Upper Darby to Ithan Avenue Station and Villanova Station before making a northward turn at the junction of Lancaster Avenue and the Blue Route toward Norristown.

Recreation and attractions

 The Appleford Estate: A 300-year-old  estate located in Villanova. Today it is maintained as an arboretum and a bird sanctuary. Its gardens were designed by renowned landscape architect Thomas Warren Sears and include woods, meadows, formal gardens, brick walkways, rhododendron tracts, a stream, pond, and waterfall. Admission is free of charge and the house is available as a rental for special events.
 The Barnes Arboretum in Merion.
Bryn Mawr Film Institute: A non-profit community theater founded in 2002 in the old Bryn Mawr Theater building, built in 1926, which is in the process of significant restoration. The institute offers showings of classic movies of the 20th century, opera, film education courses, and film discussions.
The Cynwyd Heritage Trail is a  linear 'rail-to-trail' park which opened in 2011. The trail intersects with roads, bridges, neighborhoods, parks, railway stations, historic mills, and the West Laurel Hill and Westminster Cemeteries. The trail also connects to the pedestrian-only Manayunk Bridge on the Schuylkill River, which opened in 2015.
Chanticleer Garden: An estate and botanical garden located in Wayne, which is listed on the National Register of Historic Places.
The Devon Horse Show: The oldest and largest multi-breed horse show in the U.S.
Harriton House: Located in Bryn Mawr, was built in 1704 by a Welsh Quaker named Rowland Ellis. He named the estate "Bryn Mawr", meaning "high hill" in Welsh, which is where the community gained its name. The house's best known occupant was Charles Thomson, the first and only secretary of the Continental Congress in Philadelphia.
Historic Waynesborough: Revolutionary war hero Anthony Wayne's historic estate. Alternatively known as Waynesborough, this is where Anthony Wayne was born. It is registered as a National Historic Landmark and is a historic house museum.
Jenkins Arboretum: A nonprofit botanical garden located in Devon.
King of Prussia Mall located in King of Prussia is the third-largest mall in terms of retail space in America and is only a short distance away from the Main Line.
The Lower Merion Academy was built in 1812, and is a 3.5 story, five bay, stuccoed stone building with cupola in the Federal style. It was renovated in 1938, in the Colonial Revival style.  Located in Bala Cynwyd, it is still used for educational purposes and now also houses The Lower Merion Historical Society.  It was added to the National Register of Historic Places in 2002.  The free education provided to local children in the Academy predated Pennsylvania's state laws mandating free public schooling (1834-1836).
Completed in 1715, The Merion Friends Meeting House, in Merion Station, is the third oldest Quaker Meeting House in the United States.  It is still in active use by the Society of Friends. The property also includes stables and a cemetery, with an estimated 2,000 burials (many of which are unmarked in accordance with early Quaker custom). Construction began in 1695, and the meeting house exhibits distinctively Welsh architectural features, including a cross- or T-shape building plan, that distinguish it from later Quaker meeting houses. It was declared a National Historic Landmark in 1999.
The Woodmont Estate

Sporting and social clubs

Private clubs played an important role in the development of the Main Line, offering social gathering places and facilities for cricket, golf, tennis, squash, and horseback riding to wealthy or socially connected families. Among them are:
 Aronimink Golf Club
 Merion Cricket Club
 Merion Golf Club: Ranked America's 7th best golf course in 2008 and hosted the U.S. Open in 2013.
 Overbrook Golf Club
 Philadelphia Country Club: One of the first 100 golf courses established in the USA. Hosted the 1939 U.S. Open.
Radnor Hunt: the oldest active foxhunting group in the United States
Waynesborough Country Club

Education
The school districts that serve the Main Line are Lower Merion School District in Montgomery County, Radnor Township School District and School District of Haverford Township in Delaware County, and Tredyffrin/Easttown School District and Great Valley School District in Chester County. The region has numerous nationally ranked public and private schools.  Among them are:

Public High Schools
 Great Valley High School
 Conestoga High School (Tredyffrin/Easttown SD)
 Harriton High School (Lower Merion SD)
 Lower Merion High School
 Radnor High School

Private Schools
 Academy of Notre Dame de Namur (Girls)
 Agnes Irwin School (Girls)
 The Baldwin School (Girls)
 Delaware Valley Friends School
 Devon Preparatory School (Boys)
 Holy Child School at Rosemont (Preschool-grade 8)
 Malvern Preparatory School (Boys)
 Merion Mercy Academy (Girls)
 Episcopal Academy
 Friends' Central School
 The Haverford School (Boys)
 The Mesivta High School (Boys)
 Jack M. Barrack Hebrew Academy (Co-ed)
 Kohelet Yeshiva High School (Co-ed)
 The Phelps School (Boys)
 Sacred Heart Academy Bryn Mawr (Girls)
 The Shipley School
 Valley Forge Military Academy
 Villa Maria Academy (Girls)
 Woodlynde School (Co-ed)

Parochial Schools
 Archbishop John Carroll High School
 SS Colman-John Neumann School (Pre-K~8)
 St. Aloysius Academy (Boys, Pre-K~8)
 St. Katharine of Siena School (Pre-K~8)
 St. Margaret's School (Pre-K~8)
 St. Monica's School (Pre-K~8)
 St. Norbert's School (Pre-K~8)
 St. Patrick's School (Pre-K~8)

Higher education

 Bryn Mawr College
 Cabrini University
 Eastern University
 Harcum College
 Haverford College
 Immaculata University
 Penn State Great Valley School of Graduate Professional Studies
 Rosemont College
 Saint Joseph's University
 St. Charles Borromeo Seminary
 Valley Forge Military Academy and College
 Villanova University

In popular culture

Film

1940–1989 
The Philadelphia Story (1940)
Kitty Foyle (1940)
South Pacific (1958): Character "Lt. Joe Cable, USMC" is from Ardmore
The Young Philadelphians (1959)
The Happiest Millionaire (1967)
Obsession (1976) : Starring Cliff Robertson, Genevieve Bujold and John Lithgow 
Grease (1978): Loosely based on Radnor, PA
Taps (1981): starring Timothy Hutton and Tom Cruise, filmed at VFMA, featuring scenes in Wayne (at Farmers Market and North Wayne Avenue)
Trading Places (1983) 
Mannequin (1987)

1990–present 
Downtown: Set in Bryn Mawr and filmed in Philadelphia, starring Anthony Edwards, Forest Whitaker and Joe Pantoliano
Philadelphia (1993): Tom Hanks's character celebrates Thanksgiving at his family home in Lower Merion
To Wong Foo, Thanks for Everything! Julie Newmar (1995): The setting for Patrick Swayze's character's family home is Bala Cynwyd, with those scenes filmed in Montclair, New Jersey.
Wide Awake (1998): M. Night Shyamalan movie, filmed at his alma mater, Waldron Mercy Academy, starring Rosie O'Donnell and Denis Leary.
The Sixth Sense (1999): The wake scene was set in Bryn Mawr
In Her Shoes (2005): Toni Collette's character attends a Main Line wedding and jokes about what she should wear. Starring Cameron Diaz and Shirley MacLaine
Pride (2007)
Dare (2009)
Happy Tears (2009)
Tenure (2009)
The Art of the Steal (2009): Documentary chronicling the acquisition and emigration of the Barnes art collection from Merion to Philadelphia.
The Lovely Bones (film)
Foxcatcher (2014)
Split (2016)

Literature
A Stranger Is Watching: The main character's murdered wife Nina grew up in a wealthy Philadelphia Main Line Family. In the book, it mentions that Nina went to Bryn Mawr College.
Blackbird Sisters, mystery novels by Nancy Martin
Bobos in Paradise, by David Brooks
Official Preppy Handbook, by Lisa Birnbach
The Pretty Little Liars series, by Sara Shepard, which uses the fictional Main Line suburb of Rosewood as its setting.
Pterodactyls, by Nicky Silver. The play is set in a Main Line house.
Song of Solomon, by Toni Morrison. The character First Corinthians is educated at Bryn Mawr College.
The Catcher in the Rye, by J.D. Salinger. Valley Forge Military Academy (where Salinger attended for two years) is the basis for Pencey Prep.  Additionally, the protagonist, Holden Caulfield, believes Jane Gallagher to have gone to Shipley, a Main Line private school.
The It Girl, by Cecily von Ziegesar
The Lovely Bones, by Alice Sebold
The Man of My Dreams, by Curtis Sittenfeld
The Badge of Honor Series, by W.E.B. Griffin. The main character, Matt Payne, is from Merion.
Americanah, by Chimamanda Ngozi Adichie. The main character gets assaulted by a tennis coach in Ardmore and subsequently works as a nanny on the Main Line (possibly Merion)
Luckiest Girl Alive, by Jessica Knoll, which uses the Main Line and the fictional Bradley School, based on The Shipley School, as its setting
The Ginger Barnes Main Line Mysteries, by Donna Huston Murray, take place in the Philadelphia Main Line.
 That Summer by Jennifer Weiner

Television
All My Children, Soap opera which aired from 1970 to 2011, set in a fictional suburb of Philadelphia, named Pine Valley and modeled after the town of Rosemont.
Broad City: Co-creator and co-star Abbi Jacobson is from Wayne.
Made
My Super Sweet 16
One Life to Live
Thirtysomething
Pretty Little Liars, as with the book, set in fictional Rosewood based on the city Rosemont, Pennsylvania and modeled after the town of Wayne, Pennsylvania.
How to Get Away with Murder
Mad Men: Betty Draper, Don Draper's wife in seasons one through three, is said to be from Lower Merion Township and to have attended Bryn Mawr.
Mare of Easttown: HBO mini-series starring Kate Winslet, set and filmed in Easttown Township.

Notable residents

Arts 
Tory Burch, fashion designer and New York City socialite
Albert C. Barnes, physician, chemist, businessman, art collector, writer, educator, and founder of the Barnes Foundation
Walter Annenberg, newspaper and magazine publisher (Triangle Publications), ambassador, billionaire, philanthropist
Gloria Braggiotti Etting, author, photographer, hostess, and wife of artist Emlen Etting

Business 
Ronald Perelman, billionaire, controlling owner of MacAndrews & Forbes and Revlon
J. Howard Pew, son of Joseph N. Pew, founder of Sun Oil Company, and co-founder of The Pew Charitable Trusts
John B. Thayer, cricketer, Pennsylvania Railroad VP (lost on the )
Edward T. Welburn, Vice President of Global Design, General Motors
John C. Bogle, founder and CEO of the Vanguard Group
Alexander Cassatt, former president of the Pennsylvania Railroad
Clement Acton Griscom, prominent 19th-century American shipping magnate, businessman, whose home, Dolobran in Haverford is noted for its architecture

Entertainment
David Boreanaz, actor 
The family of Georg Ludwig von Trapp, the family depicted in The Sound of Music
Chubby Checker, musician
Gideon Glick, actor
Patti LaBelle, musician
Teddy Pendergrass, musician
M. Night Shyamalan, film director
Abbi Jacobson, co-star and co-creator of Comedy Central television series Broad City
Kate DiCamillo, children's book author
Anne Francine, actress and singer

Military / government / science 
Henry H. "Hap" Arnold, Commanding General of the U.S. Army Air Forces during World War II; General of the Army, General of the Air Force
John Hickenlooper, governor of Colorado
Bill Folger, Founder, American Society for the Adoption of the Metric System
Pete Conrad, NASA astronaut; third man to walk on the moon
Alexander Haig, U.S. Secretary of State, White House Chief of Staff, Supreme Allied Commander Europe
Charles Thomson, secretary of the Continental Congress from 1774 to 1789
Harris Wofford, former U.S. senator from Pennsylvania
David Eisenhower and Julie Nixon Eisenhower
Oscar Goodman, mayor of Las Vegas, Nevada
Andy Hertzfeld, computer scientist (Apple)
Hilary Koprowski, polio vaccine pioneer 
Anthony Wayne, US Army officer and statesman

Sports 
 Mark Herzlich, NFL football player
 Kyle Eckel, NFL football player
 Julius Erving, Hall of Fame NBA basketball player
 Kobe Bryant, NBA basketball player and incoming Hall of Famer
 Richie Ashburn, Hall of Fame baseball player with the Philadelphia Phillies and Phillies broadcaster
 Hobart "Hobey" Baker, amateur hockey and football player, member of the Hockey Hall of Fame
 Kyle Korver, NBA basketball player
 Allen Iverson, Hall of Fame NBA basketball player
 Jeffrey Lurie, owner of the Philadelphia Eagles football team
 Emlen Tunnell, member of the Pro Football Hall of Fame as a player, born in Bryn Mawr
 John Spagnola, former NFL football player
 Andy Reid, head coach of the NFL's Philadelphia Eagles and the Kansas City Chiefs
 Edward M. Snider, chairman of Comcast Spectacor, Philadelphia Flyers
 Jay Wright, head coach of the Villanova Wildcats men's basketball team

See also

References

Further reading 

Geography of Philadelphia
American upper class
History of Philadelphia
 
Transportation in Philadelphia
Regions of Pennsylvania
Upper class culture in Pennsylvania